Tormod is a masculine Norwegian and Scottish Gaelic given name. The Norwegian name is derived from the Old Norse personal name . An Anglicised form of the Scottish Gaelic name is Norman. The Irish surname Tormey or Tarmey translate into English as "descendant of Tormach". The name Tormach is a Gaelic derivative of the Old Norse personal name Þórmóðr. Tormey or Tarmey are the anglicised versions of Ó Tormaigh or Ó Tormadha.

People with the given name
Tormod Andreassen, Norwegian curler
Tormod Kark, slave and friend of Håkon Sigurdsson
Tormod Kristoffer Hustad (1889–1973), Norwegian councillor of state and minister
Tormod Granheim (born 1974), Norwegian adventurer and motivational speaker
Tormod Haugen (1945–2008), Norwegian author
Tormod Kristoffer Hustad (1889–1973), Norwegian architect and politician
Tormod Knutsen (1932–2021), Norwegian Nordic combined athlete
Tormod MacGill-Eain (1937–2017), Scottish Gaelic comedian, novelist, poet, musician and broadcaster
Tormod MacLeod ( 13th century), a Scottish clan chief
Tormod Mobraaten (1910–1991), Norwegian-Canadian skier
Tormod Skagestad (1920–1997), Norwegian poet, novelist, playwright, actor and theatre director
Tormod Petter Svennevig (1929–2016), Norwegian diplomat and politician
Tormod Bjørkhaug Jakobsen (1994-) Norwegian percussionist in Strusshamn Musikkforening, Archaeologist

Citations

References

Norwegian masculine given names
Scottish Gaelic masculine given names
Scottish masculine given names